Stephanonectria is a genus of fungi in the class Sordariomycetes. This is a monotypic genus, containing the single species Stephanonectria keithii.

References

Bionectriaceae
Monotypic Sordariomycetes genera